Falke is German for hawk. It may refer to:

Aircraft 
Dornier Do H, a German monoplane fighter of the 1920s
Focke-Wulf Fw 43, a light utility aircraft developed in 1932
Focke-Wulf Fw 187, a German 1930s twin-engine fighter 
Scheibe Falke, a motor glider
Slingsby Falke, a motor glider
Sokopf Falke, an Austrian paramotor design

Ships 

 SMS Falke, an Imperial German Navy unprotected cruiser
 German trawler V 104 Falke, a German cargo ship converted into an auxiliary warship in World War II

People 
Gustav Falke (1853–1916), German writer
Johannes Falke (1823–1876), German historian
Falké Bacharou, Nigerian politician

Other uses 
 T4 model of the G7e torpedo, a German U-boat torpedo of World War II
 Falke (spacecraft), a German program to fly a subscale model of the Space Shuttle orbiter

See also
Falkes de Breauté (died 1226), Anglo-Norman soldier and High Sheriff
Falke, Falcken, Falken, Falkenreck, an Ancient Noble German family
 Falk (name)
 Phalke (surname)
Surnames from nicknames